The following is a list of railway companies which operate routes on Swiss territory.

Standard gauge
The following is a complete list of all  railway companies which operate routes on Swiss territory. It also includes routes of foreign railway companies (e.g. Deutsche Bahn), but not routes of Swiss companies in neighbouring countries.

Not included are railway companies which do not operate their own routes (e.g. Cisalpino, Hupac or the former Lokoop) as well as operators of short connecting goods lines.

If there is no abbreviation shown, it means that this company always appears with its full name.

Companies in operation today (standard gauge)

All companies
{| class="wikitable sortable"
|----
!Company
!Abbreviation
!From
!Until
!Notes
|----- bgcolor="#bbddbb"
|
AlpTransit Gotthard
|ATG
|1998
|
|building company, subsidiary of SBB, no public railway tracks currently
|----- bgcolor="#bbddbb"
|
BLS AG
|BLS
|2006
|
|
|----- bgcolor="#bbddbb"
|
BLS Lötschbergbahn
|BLS
|1996
|
|
|---- bgcolor="#ddddbb"
|
Bern-Lötschberg-Simplon-Bahn
|BLS
|1907
|1996
|
|---- bgcolor="#dddddd"
|
Spiez-Frutigen-Bahn
|SFB
|1901
|1906
|
|---- bgcolor="#dddddd"
|
Thunerseebahn
|TSB
|1893
|1912
|
|---- bgcolor="#eaeaea"
|
Bödelibahn
|BB
|1872
|1900
|
|---- bgcolor="#ddddbb"
|
Bern-Neuenburg-Bahn
|BN
|1901
|1996
|
|---- bgcolor="#ddddbb"
|
Gürbetal-Bern-Schwarzenburg-Bahn
|GBS
|1944
|1996
|
|---- bgcolor="#dddddd"
|
Bern-Schwarzenburg-Bahn
|BSB
|1907
|1943
|
|---- bgcolor="#dddddd"
|
Gürbetalbahn
|GTB
|1901
|1943
|
|---- bgcolor="#ddddbb"
|
Spiez-Erlach-Zweisimmen-Bahn
|SEZ
|1942
|1996
|Also known as Simmentalbahn
|---- bgcolor="#dddddd"
|
Erlenbach-Zweisimmen-Bahn
|EZB
|1902
|1941
|
|---- bgcolor="#dddddd"
|
Spiez-Erlenbach-Bahn
|SEB
|1897
|1941
|
|---- bgcolor="#bbddbb"
|
Regionalverkehr Mittelland|RM
|1997
|2006
|
|---- bgcolor="#ddddbb"
|
Emmental-Burgdorf-Thun-Bahn
|EBT
|1942
|1996
|
|---- bgcolor="#dddddd"
|
Burgdorf-Thun-Bahn
|BTB
|1899
|1941
|
|---- bgcolor="#dddddd"
|
Emmentalbahn
|EB
|1875
|1941
|
|---- bgcolor="#eaeaea"
|
Schweizerische Centralbahn
|SCB
|(1876)
|(1883)
|Section Solothurn-Biberist EBT
|---- bgcolor="#ddddbb"
|
Solothurn-Münster Bahn
|SMB
|1908
|1996
|
|---- bgcolor="#ddddbb"
|
Vereinigte Huttwil-Bahnen
|VHB
|1944
|1996
|
|---- bgcolor="#dddddd"
|
Huttwil-Wolhusen-Bahn
|HWB
|1895
|1943
|
|---- bgcolor="#dddddd"
|
Langenthal-Huttwil-Bahn
|LHB
|1927
|1943
|
|---- bgcolor="#eaeaea"
|
Langenthal-Huttwil-Bahn
|LHB
|1889
|1926
|
|---- bgcolor="#eaeaea"
|
Huttwil-Eriswil-Bahn
|HEB
|1915
|1926
|
|---- bgcolor="#dddddd"
|
Ramsei-Sumiswald-Huttwil-Bahn
|RSHB
|1908
|1943
|
|---- bgcolor="#bbddbb"
|Chemin de fer de l'Etat de Genève|CFEG
|1888
|
|Genève-Eaux-Vives–Annemasse, operated by SNCF on behalf of the canton. After construction of the Eaux-Vives–La Praille link, it will become the property of the SBB
|---- bgcolor="#bbddbb"
|Chemins de fer du Jura|CJ
|1944
|
|partly narrow gauge
|---- bgcolor="#ddddbb"
|
Régional Porrentruy-Bonfol
|RPB
|1901
|1943
|
|---- bgcolor="#ddddbb"
|
Régional Saignelégier-Glovelier
|RSG
|1904
|1943
|Narrow gauge since 1953
|---- bgcolor="#bbddbb"
|Chemin de fer Vevey-Chexbres|VCh
|1904
|
|Route leased to SBB
|---- bgcolor="#bbddbb"
|Dampfbahn-Verein Zürcher Oberland|DVZO
|2000
|
|Bäretswil-Bauma, heritage railway operating since 1978
|---- bgcolor="#ddddbb"
|
SBB-CFF-FFS
|SBB
|1947
|(2000)
|Bäretswil-Bauma, transferred to DVZO in 2000
|---- bgcolor="#dddddd"
|
Uerikon-Bauma-Bahn
|UeBB
|1901
|1948
|
|---- bgcolor="#bbddbb"
|Deutsche Bahn|DB AG
|1994
|
|Around Schaffhausen and Basel, tracks owned by the German state
|---- bgcolor="#ddddbb"
|
Deutsche Bundesbahn
|DB
|1952
|1994
|
|---- bgcolor="#dddddd"
|
Betriebsvereinigung der Südwestdeutschen Eisenbahnen
|SWDE
|1948
|1952
|Under sequestration
|---- bgcolor="#eaeaea"
|
Deutsche Eisenbahn-Strecken in der Schweiz
|DR
|1945
|1948
|Under sequestration
|----
|
Deutsche Reichsbahn
|DRB
|1937
|1945
|
|----
|
Deutsche Reichsbahn-Gesellschaft
|DRG
|1924
|1937
|
|----
|
Deutsche Reichseisenbahnen
|
|1920
|1924
|
|----
|
Großherzoglich Badische Staatseisenbahnen
|BadStB
|1855
|1920
|
|----
|
Wiesentalbahn
|
|1862
|1889
|Integrated into BadStB in 1889
|---- bgcolor="#bbddbb"
|Ferrovie dello Stato|FS
|1992
|
|Passenger services: Trenitalia
|---- bgcolor="#ddddbb"
|
Ente Ferrovie dello Stato
|FS
|1905
|1991
|
|---- bgcolor="#dddddd"
|
Strade ferrate meridionali
|SFM
|1885
|1905
|
|---- bgcolor="#eaeaea"
|
Società ferroviaria dell'Alta Italia
|SFAI
|1876
|1885
|
|- --- style="background:#BBDDBB"
|Hafenbahn Schweiz AG| 
| 2010
|
| 
|- --- style="background:#DDDDBB"
|
Hafenbahn des Kantons Basel-Stadt
| HBS
| 1924
| 2010
| Kleinhüningen, St. Johann, freight only
|- --- style="background:#DDDDBB"
|
Hafenbahn des Kantons Basel-Landschaft
| HBL
| 1940
| 2010
| Au, Birsfelden, freight only
|----  bgcolor="#bbddbb"
|Kriens-Luzern-Bahn|KLB
|1886
|
|Passenger service discontinued, goods traffic only
|---- bgcolor="#bbddbb"
|Métro Lausanne-Ouchy|LO
|1877
|
|Funicular before 1958
|---- bgcolor="#bbddbb"
|Oensingen-Balsthal-Bahn|OeBB
|1899
|
|
|---- bgcolor="#bbddbb"
|Österreichische Bundesbahnen|ÖBB
|1947
|
|Around Buchs and St. Margrethen
|---- bgcolor="#ddddbb"
|
Österreichische Staatseisenbahnen
|ÖStB
|1945
|1947
|
|---- bgcolor="#dddddd"
|
Deutsche Eisenbahn-Strecken in der Schweiz
|DR
|1945
|1945
|Under sequestration
|---- bgcolor="#eaeaea"
|
Deutsche Reichsbahn
|DR
|1938
|1945
|
|----
|
Bundesbahnen Österreichs
|BBÖ
|1921
|1938
|
|----
|
Österreichische Staatsbahnen
|ÖStB
|1919
|1921
|
|----
|
Kaiserlich-königliche österreichische Staatsbahnen
|KKÖStB
|1885
|1919
|
|----
|
Vorarlbergerbahn
|VB
|1872
|1885
|
|---- bgcolor="#bbddbb"
|Rigi Bahnen|RB
|1992
|
|
|---- bgcolor="#ddddbb"
|
Arth-Rigi-Bahn
|ARB
|1873
|1992
|
|---- bgcolor="#ddddbb"
|
Vitznau-Rigi-Bahn
|VRB
|1969
|1992
|Change of name
|---- bgcolor="#dddddd"
|
Rigi Bahn
|RB
|1871
|1969
|
|---- bgcolor="#bbddbb"
|Rorschach-Heiden-Bahn|RHB
|1875
|2006
|Merged with Appenzeller Bahnen in 2006
|---- bgcolor="#bbddbb"
|SBB-CFF-FFS|SBB CFF FFS
|1902
|
|
|---- bgcolor="#ddddbb"
|
Aargauische Südbahn
|AS
|1874
|1901
|
|---- bgcolor="#ddddbb"
|
Bötzbergbahn
|
|1875
|1902
|
|---- bgcolor="#ddddbb"
|
Genève-La Plaine
|
|1894
|1912
|
|---- bgcolor="#dddddd"
|
Paris-Lyon-Méditerranée
|PLM
|1862
|(1894)
|
|---- bgcolor="#eaeaea"
|
Lyon-Genève
|LG
|1858
|1862
|
|---- bgcolor="#ddddbb"
|
Chemin de fer Vevey-Chexbres
|VCh
|1904
|2013
|Route leased to SBB
|---- bgcolor="#ddddbb"
|
Gotthardbahn
|GB
|1874
|1909
|
|---- bgcolor="#ddddbb"
|
Jura neuchâtelois
|JN
|1886
|1913
|
|---- bgcolor="#dddddd"
|
Jura-Bern-Lucerne-Bahn
|JBL
|1884
|(1886)
|Neuchâtel-Le Locle Col des Roches
|---- bgcolor="#ddddbb"
|
Chemin de fer Jura-Simplon
|JS
|1890
|1903
|
|---- bgcolor="#dddddd"
|
Jura-Bern-Lucerne-Bahn
|JBL
|1884
|1889
|Neuchâtel-Le Locle Col des Roches to JN in 1886
|---- bgcolor="#eaeaea"
|
Bern-Luzern-Bahn
|BLB
|1875
|1884
|
|----
|
Bernische Staatsbahn
|BSB
|1861
|(1875)
|Gümligen-Langnau
|----
|
Schweizerische Ostwestbahn
|
|1860
|1861
|
|---- bgcolor="#eaeaea"
|
Jura bernois
|JB
|1874
|1884
|
|----
|
Jura industriel
|JI
|1857
|1875
|
|----
|
Porrentruy-Delle
|PD
|1872
|1876
|
|----
|
Bernische Staatsbahn
|BSB
|1861
|1877
|Gümligen-Langnau to BLB in 1875
|----
|
Schweizerische Ostwestbahn
|
|1860
|1861
|
|---- bgcolor="#dddddd"
|
Chemin de fer Pont-Vallorbe
|PV
|1886
|1890
|
|---- bgcolor="#dddddd"
|
Suisse Occidentale-Simplon
|SOS
|1881
|1889
|
|---- bgcolor="#eaeaea"
|
Suisse-Occidentale
|SO
|1872
|1881
|
|----
|
Franco-Suisse
|FS
|1859
|1871
|
|----
|
Lausanne-Fribourg-Berne
|LFB
|1858
|1871
|
|----
|
Genève-Versoix
|GV
|1858
|1858
|
|----
|
Ouest Suisse
|OS
|1855
|1871
|
|----
|
Jougne-Eclépens
|JE
|1870
|1876
|
|---- bgcolor="#eaeaea"
|
Simplon
|S
|1874
|1881
|
|----
|
Ligne d'italie
|LI
|1859
|1874
|
|---- bgcolor="#ddddbb"
|
Schweizerische Centralbahn
|SCB
|1854
|1901
|
|---- bgcolor="#dddddd"
|
Chemins de fer de l'Est
|EST
|1854
|1872
|Section Basel-St. Johann-Grenze
|---- bgcolor="#eaeaea"
|
Strasbourg-Bâle
|
|1844
|1854
|
|---- bgcolor="#dddddd"
|
Schweizerische Nordostbahn
|NOB
|1853
|(1881)
|Section Suhr-Zofingen
|---- bgcolor="#ddddbb"
|
Schweizerische Nordostbahn
|NOB
|1853
|1902
|Suhr-Zofingen to SCB in 1881
|---- bgcolor="#dddddd"
|
Sulgen-Gossau (Bischofszellerbahn)
|SG
|1876
|1885
|
|---- bgcolor="#dddddd"
|
Bülach-Regensberg-Bahn
|BR
|1865
|1876
|
|---- bgcolor="#dddddd"
|
Effretikon-Wetzikon-Hinwil-Bahn
|EH
|1876
|1885
|
|---- bgcolor="#dddddd"
|
Schweizerische Nordbahn
|
|1847
|1853
|First railway company of Switzerland
|---- bgcolor="#dddddd"
|
Schweizerische Nationalbahn
|SNB
|1875
|1880
|
|---- bgcolor="#dddddd"
|
Zürich-Zug-Luzern-Bahn
|ZZL
|1864
|1891
|
|---- bgcolor="#ddddbb"
|
Seethalbahn
|STB
|1883
|1922
|
|---- bgcolor="#ddddbb"
|
Sensetalbahn
|STB
|1904
|2000
|
|---- bgcolor="#ddddbb"
|
Toggenburgerbahn
|TB
|1870
|1902
|
|---- bgcolor="#ddddbb"
|
Tösstalbahn
|TTB
|1875
|1917
|
|---- bgcolor="#ddddbb"
|
Uerikon-Bauma-Bahn
|UeBB
|1901
|1948
|
|---- bgcolor="#ddddbb"
|
Vereinigte Schweizerbahnen
|VSB
|1857
|1902
|
|---- bgcolor="#dddddd"
|
Glatttalbahn
|
|1856
|1857
|
|---- bgcolor="#dddddd"
|
Sankt-Gallisch-Appenzellischen Eisenbahn
|
|1855
|1857
|
|---- bgcolor="#dddddd"
|
Schweizerische Südostbahn
|
|1853
|1857
|Not to be confused with today's SOB
|---- bgcolor="#ddddbb"
|
Wald-Rüti-Bahn
|WR
|1876
|1902
|
|---- bgcolor="#ddddbb"
|
Wohlen-Bremgarten
|WB
|1876
|1901
|line leased to Bremgarten-Dietikon-Bahn in 1912, dual gauge
|---- bgcolor="#bbddbb"
|Südostbahn|SOB
|2001
|
|Fusion
|---- bgcolor="#ddddbb"
|
Bodensee-Toggenburg-Bahn
|BT
|1910
|2000
|
|---- bgcolor="#ddddbb"
|
Schweizerische Südostbahn
|SOB
|1890
|2000
|
|---- bgcolor="#dddddd"
|
Wädenswil-Einsiedeln-Bahn
|WE
|1877
|1889
|
|---- bgcolor="#dddddd"
|
Zürichsee-Gotthardbahn
|ZGB
|1878
|1889
|
|---- bgcolor="#bbddbb"
|Sihltal Zürich Uetliberg Bahn|SZU
|1973
|
|
|---- bgcolor="#ddddbb"
|
Sihltalbahn
|SiTB
|1892
|1972
|
|---- bgcolor="#ddddbb"
|
Bahngesellschaft Zürich-Üetliberg
|BZUe
|1922
|1972
|Change of name after bankruptcy of earlier company
|---- bgcolor="#dddddd"
|
Uetlibergbahn-Gesellschaft
|UeB
|1875
|1922
|
|---- bgcolor="#bbddbb"
|Société Nationale des Chemins de fer Français|SNCF
|1938
|
|Around Basel and Geneva
|---- bgcolor="#ddddbb"
|
Alsace-Lorraine
|AL
|1918
|1938
|
|---- bgcolor="#dddddd"
|
Reichseisenbahn Elsaß-Lothringen
|EL
|1872
|1918
|
|---- bgcolor="#eaeaea"
|
Chemins de fer de l'Est
|EST
|1854
|1872
|
|----
|
Strasbourg-Bâle
|
|1844
|1854
|
|---- bgcolor="#ddddbb"
|
Paris-Lyon-Méditerranée
|PLM
|1862
|1938
|
|---- bgcolor="#dddddd"
|
Lyon-Genève
|LG
|1858
|1862
|
|---- bgcolor="#bbddbb"
|Sursee-Triengen-Bahn|ST
|1912
|
|Passenger service discontinued, goods traffic only
|---- bgcolor="#bbddbb"
|Tramway du sud-ouest lausannois|TOSL
|1991
|
|
|---- bgcolor="#bbddbb"
|THURBO|
|2002
|
|Subsidiary of SBB
|---- bgcolor="#ddddbb"
|
Mittelthurgau-Bahn
|MThB
|1911
|2002
|
|---- bgcolor="#ddddbb"
|
SBB-CFF-FFS
|SBB CFF FFS
|(1902)
|(2002)
|Regional services in north-eastern Switzerland
|---- bgcolor="#bbddbb"
|Transports de Martigny et Régions|TMR
|2001
|
|Partly narrow gauge
|---- bgcolor="#ddddbb"
|
Chemin de fer Martigny-Orsières-Le Châble
|MO
|1910
|2001
|
|---- bgcolor="#bbddbb"
|Transports publics Fribourgeois|TPF
|2000
|
|Partly narrow gauge
|---- bgcolor="#ddddbb"
|
Chemins de fer Fribourgeois Gruyère-Fribourg-Morat
|GFM
|1942
|2000
|Partly narrow gauge
|---- bgcolor="#dddddd"
|
Chemin de fer Bulle-Romont
|BR
|1868
|1941
|
|---- bgcolor="#dddddd"
|
Chemin de fer Fribourg-Morat-Anet
|FMA
|1903
|1941
|
|---- bgcolor="#eaeaea"
|
Fribourg-Morat
|FM
|1898
|1903
|
|---- bgcolor="#bbddbb"
|Transports Régionaux Neuchâtelois|TRN
|1999
|
|Partly narrow gauge
|---- bgcolor="#ddddbb"
|
Chemin de fer Régional du Val-de-Travers
|RVT
|1883
|1998
|
|---- bgcolor="#bbddbb"
|Transports Vallée de Joux - Yverdon-les-Bains - Ste-Croix|TRAVYS
|2001
|
|
|---- bgcolor="#ddddbb"
|
Chemin de fer Orbe-Chavornay
|OC
|1894
|2000
|
|---- bgcolor="#ddddbb"
|
Chemin de fer Pont-Brassus
|PBr
|1899
|2000
|
|---- bgcolor="#ddbbbb"
|Wohlen-Meisterschwanden-Bahn|WM
|1916
|1997
|† merged with BD to BDWM Transport on 31 May 1997
|----
|}

Narrow gauge

All companies

External links
 RAIL-INFO SWITZERLAND (in English)

Tramways

 BLT Baselland Transport AG (Basel)
 BVB Basler Verkehrs-Betriebe (Basel)
 RiT Riffelalptram (Zermatt)
 SVB BERNMOBIL Städtische Verkehrsbetriebe Bern (Bern)
 TN  Transports publics du littoral neuchatelois (Neuchâtel)
 TPG Transports Publics Genevois (Geneva)

Closed or merged
 ABB Altstätten-Berneck-Bahn (later RhStB)
 AF Strassenbahn Altdorf-Flüelen (closed 26 March 1951)
 CBV Tramway Chillon-Byron-Villeneuve (later VMCV)
 ESZ Elektrische Strassenbahnen im Kanton Zug (closed 21 May 1955)
 MRA Trambahn Meiringen-Reichenbach-Aareschlucht (closed 16 September 1956)
 RhStB Rheintalische Strassenbahn (later RhV)
 RhV Rheintalische Verkehrsbetriebe (closed 2 June 1973)
 SSS Strassenbahn Schwyz-Seewen (later SStB)
 SStB Schwyzer Strassenbahnen (closed  15 December 1963)
 StrStM Strassenbahn St. Moritz (closed  18 September 1932)
 SchSt Schaffhauser Strassenbahn (closed 6 March 1970)
 StSS Strassenbahn Schaffhausen-Schleitheim (closed  1 October 1964)
 StSt Strassenbahn Stansstad-Stans (closed)
 StStW Städtische Strassenbahn Winterthur (closed  2 November 1951)
 STI Steffisburg-Thun-Interlaken (closed  31 May 1958)
 STL Tramway Locarno (closed 30 April 1960)
 SVB Spiezer Verbindungsbahn (closed 25 September 1960)
 (TB) Tramway Bellavista (closed 31 October 1913)
 TC Tramway de La Chaux-de-Fonds (closed 15 June 1950)
 TEL Tram Lugano (closed 17 December 1959)
 TEM Tram Mendrisio (closed 31 December 1950)
 TF Tramway de Fribourg (closed 1 April 1965)
 TL Tramways lausannois (closed 6 January 1964)
 TP Tramway-funiculaire Trait-Planches (closed 11 November 1912)
 TrB Tramway de Bienne/Biel (closed 9 December 1948)
 TrL Tram Luzern (closed 11 November 1961)
 TrMB Tramway Martigny-Bourg (closed 31 December 1956)
 TStG Trambahn der Stadt St. Gallen (closed 1 October 1957)
 UOeB Uster-Oetwil-Bahn (closed 10 January 1949)
 VMC Tramway Vevey-Montreux-Chillon (later VMCV)
 VMCV Tramway Vevey-Montreux-Chillon-Villeneuve (closed 19 January 1958)
 WMB Wetzikon-Meilen-Bahn (closed 13 May 1950)
 ZBB''' Zuger Berg- und Strassenbahn (closed 10 May 1959)

See also
 Rail transport in Switzerland
 History of rail transport in Switzerland
 List of railway companies
 Mountain railways in Switzerland
 Rack railways in Switzerland

References

External links
Jane's World Railways (hard copy)

 
Companies
Switzerland
Railway